General Edward Charles Frome (7 January 1802 – 2 November 1890) was a prominent British Army officer and Surveyor General of South Australia.

Early life
Born in Gibraltar on 7 January 1802, Frome was orphaned early in his life. He was educated in Blackheath, London, England, where he became a close friend of Benjamin Disraeli.

Career
He received his commission in the Royal Engineers in 1825. He was involved in the Rideau Canal construction in Canada in 1827 to 1833.

In September 1839 Frome arrived in South Australia on the ship  Recovery to take up an appointment as the colony's third Surveyor General. He was also a member of the South Australian Legislative Council (2 October 1839 to 14 June 1843). He made an important contribution in surveying large areas of South Australia for new immigrants to settle upon.

He was also a competent artist and made many sketches and paintings of landscapes on his surveying expeditions. In one of his sketchbooks, there is a sketch of a Milmenrura village in the south-east of South Australia consisting of a cluster of about twelve established Aboriginal homes. It is annotated with the note "burnt by me, October 1840". This was apparently part of the retribution for the Maria massacre of shipwrecked survivors a few months earlier.

In 1843 he led an expedition to the mid-north of South Australia and was the first to accurately map Lake Frome.

After his ten-year term expired he returned to England and was subsequently stationed in Mauritius, Scotland and Gibraltar. Between 1869 and 1874 he served as Lieutenant Governor of Guernsey.

Later life and legacy
He retired in 1877 with the army rank of general, and died on 2 November 1890 at Ewell in Surrey.

His name was given to two lakes – Lake Frome in the state's north-east and Lake Frome in the state's south-east; Frome River in the Lake Eyre basin; and Frome Road, a major thoroughfare in Adelaide.

See also
History of Adelaide
Water Witch (1835 cutter)

References

 McGrath, Sandra; & Olsen, John. (1981). The Artist and the Desert. Bay Books: Sydney. 

|-

Australian surveyors
History of Adelaide
Explorers of South Australia
1802 births
1890 deaths
British Army generals
Royal Engineers officers
Graduates of the Royal Military Academy, Woolwich
19th-century British painters
British male painters
Gibraltarian emigrants to England
Surveyors General of South Australia
Members of the South Australian Legislative Council
Colony of South Australia people
19th-century Australian politicians
19th-century British male artists